Alex Mendez (born September 6, 2000) is an American professional soccer player who plays as a midfielder for Primeira Liga club Vizela.

Club career

LA Galaxy 
Mendez made his professional debut for USL Championship club LA Galaxy II in a 1–0 win against Orange County SC on August 3, 2017 coming on as a 34th-minute substitute for Andre Ulrich Zanga.

SC Freiburg 
On October 23, 2018, Mendez announced that he had signed a professional contract for the Bundesliga club SC Freiburg in Germany.

Mendez scored three goals in 12 appearances in the U19 Bundesliga.

Ajax 
On July 30, 2019, Mendez was signed by Ajax on a three-year deal. He made his official debut playing for the reserves team Jong Ajax in the Dutch Eerste Divisie, the 2nd-tier of professional football in the Netherlands, in a match against N.E.C. which ended in a 3–3 deadlock.

Vizela 
On July 3, 2021, it was announced that Mendez would transfer to Portuguese club F.C. Vizela for an undisclosed transfer fee.

On August 6, 2021, Mendez made his debut as a starter in the Primeira Liga season opener in a 3–0 loss at home against Sporting CP.

International career
Mendez has been capped by the United States at the under-17, under-20, and under-23 levels.

In 2018, Mendez was awarded the Young Player of the Year award for the United States.

Personal life
Born in the United States, Mendez is of Mexican descent.

Honors
United States U20
CONCACAF U-20 Championship: 2018

Individual
CONCACAF Under-20 Championship Best XI: 2018
CONCACAF Under-20 Championship Golden Ball: 2018

References

External links

 
 

2000 births
Living people
American sportspeople of Mexican descent
American soccer players
Soccer players from California
Association football midfielders
United States men's youth international soccer players
United States men's under-20 international soccer players
LA Galaxy II players
SC Freiburg players
AFC Ajax players
Jong Ajax players
F.C. Vizela players
USL Championship players
Eerste Divisie players
American expatriate soccer players
American expatriate soccer players in Germany
American expatriate sportspeople in the Netherlands
Expatriate footballers in the Netherlands
American expatriate sportspeople in Portugal
Expatriate footballers in Portugal